Kevin Ronald Tamati (born 21 September 1953) is a New Zealand former rugby league representative player and coach. He played at representative level for New Zealand, New Zealand Māori, Auckland, Central Districts and Wellington, and professionally at club level for Widnes, Warrington and Salford, Chorley Borough in the forwards. He has coached the New Zealand Māori, and professionally for Salford, Chorley Borough/Lancashire Lynx, British Army Rugby League and Whitehaven. He is the cousin of fellow international Howie Tamati.

Early life and family
Born in 1953 of Ngāti Kahungunu and Ngāti Mutunga descent, Tamati was educated at Hastings Boys' High School. He is the cousin of Howie Tamati.

Playing career
After moving to Wellington in 1971 Tamati took up rugby league, joining the Petone Panthers club. He later played for the Upper Hutt Tigers and the Randwick Kingfishers. He made the Junior Kiwis in 1973. A Wellington representative, Tamati made a name for himself as a tough player.

He moved to England in 1982 and had success with both Widnes and Warrington. During the 1984 season Tamati played on Saturday for the Northcote Tigers in the Auckland Rugby League competition and then flew down to Wellington on Sundays to play for the Randwick Kingfishers. During this season Tamati also represented Auckland.

A Wellington representative and New Zealand international, Tamati played 52 times for Wellington and for the Kiwis from 1979 until 1985. He is perhaps best known for his fight with Australian prop Greg Dowling which continued on the sideline after both players had been sent to the sin-bin by French referee Julien Rascagneres. Tamati won caps for New Zealand in 1979 against Great Britain (3 matches), in 1980 against Australia (2 matches), and Great Britain (3 matches), and France (2 matches), in 1981 against France, while at Widnes in 1982 against Australia (2 matches), and Papua New Guinea, in 1984 against Great Britain, in 1985 against Australia (2 matches), in 1985 in the 1985–1988 Rugby League World Cup against Australia, in 1985 against Great Britain (interchange/substitute), and in 1985 in the 1985–1988 Rugby League World Cup against Great Britain. In total Tamati playing in 37 games for the Kiwis, including 29 test matches.

Premiership Final appearances
Kevin Tamati played in Warrington's 38–10 victory over Halifax in the Premiership Final during the 1985–86 season at Elland Road, Leeds on Sunday 18 May 1986.

Challenge Cup Final appearances
Kevin Tamati played right-, i.e. number 10, in Widnes' 19–6 victory over Wigan in the 1984 Challenge Cup Final during the 1983–84 season at Wembley Stadium, London on Saturday 5 May 1984, in front of a crowd of 80,116.

County Cup Final appearances
Kevin Tamati played right-, i.e. number 10, in Widnes' 8–12 defeat by Barrow in the 1983 Lancashire County Cup Final during the 1983–84 season at Central Park, Wigan on Saturday 1 October 1983, played as an interchange/substitute, i.e. number 15, (replacing  Les Boyd) in Warrington's 8–34 defeat by Wigan in the 1985 Lancashire County Cup Final during the 1985–86 season at Knowsley Road, St. Helens, on Sunday 13 October 1985, and played left-, i.e.number 8, in the 16–28 defeat by Wigan in the 1987 Lancashire County Cup Final during the 1987–88 season at Knowsley Road, St. Helens on Sunday 11 October 1987.

John Player Special Trophy Final appearances
Kevin Tamati played right-, i.e. number 10, in Widnes' 10-18 defeat by Leeds in the 1983–84 John Player Special Trophy Final during the 1983–84 season at Central Park, Wigan on Saturday 14 January 1984, and played  (replaced by interchange/substitute Alan Rathbone at half-time) in Warrington's 4-18 defeat by Wigan in the 1986–87 John Player Special Trophy Final during the 1986–87 season at Burnden Park, Bolton on Saturday 10 January 1987.

Coaching career
Tamati coached the Salford from 1989 until 1993.

Tamati was employed as a rugby league development officer with Warrington Borough Council for nine years from 1989 to 1997 when he left in 1997 to take up a full-time position coaching the Lancashire Lynx. Tamati had previously been coaching Chorley Borough part-time, but the club's rebirth as the Lancashire Lynx prompted him to take up the roll full-time. Tamati was released by Lynx at end of the 1998 season, after failing to agree a new contract.

Tamati then began a two-year spell coaching the Whitehaven.

In 2006 Tamati was coach of the New Zealand Māori rugby league team.

Later years
Tamati was inducted into the New Zealand Rugby League Legends of League in 1995. He is an Auckland Rugby League Immortal.

Tamati is currently chairman and referee coordinator for Rugby League Hawkes Bay.

In 2012 he was named in the Wellington Rugby League's Team of the Century.

References

External links
NZRL Roll of Honour

Photograph "Kiwi Team Photo 1980 - REAR: Tupaea, Fisher, Baxendale, West, Whittaker, Kemble, Muru, Edkins. CENTRE: Rushton, O' Donnell, Leuluai, Broadhurst, Green, Tamati, Te Ariki, Gall, Dickison. FRONT: Kells, Coll, Kevin Tamati, Mountford (coach), Graham (captain), Nesbitt (manager), Ah... - Date: 01/01/1980" at rlhp.co.uk
(archived by web.archive.org) Statistics at rugby.widnes.tv
(archived by web.archive.org) Statistics at wolvesplayers.thisiswarrington.co.uk

1953 births
Living people
Auckland rugby league team players
Central Districts rugby league team players
Chorley Lynx coaches
Junior Kiwis players
New Zealand Māori rugby league players
New Zealand Māori rugby league team coaches
New Zealand Māori rugby league team players
New Zealand national rugby league team players
New Zealand expatriate sportspeople in England
New Zealand rugby league coaches
New Zealand rugby league players
Ngāti Kahungunu people
Ngāti Mutunga people
Northcote Tigers players
People educated at Hastings Boys' High School
Petone Panthers players
Randwick Kingfishers players
Rugby league players from Hawke's Bay Region
Rugby league props
Rugby league second-rows
Salford Red Devils coaches
Upper Hutt Tigers players
Warrington Wolves players
Wellington rugby league team players
Whitehaven R.L.F.C. coaches
Widnes Vikings players